Lochmaeus bilineata, the double-lined prominent moth,  is a moth of the  family Notodontidae. It is found in the eastern two-thirds of the United States and southern Canada, west to New Mexico in the south and Saskatchewan in the north.

The wingspan is 32–40 mm. Adults have grey to brownish-grey forewings. They are on wing from April to October in the south and from June to August in the north.

The larvae feed on Fagus, Quercus, Tilia, Betula and Ulmus species.

Gallery

References

Moths described in 1864
Notodontidae
Moths of North America